J. C. Tran (born Justin Cuong Van Tran January 20, 1977 in Vietnam) is a Vietnamese-American professional poker player, based in Sacramento, California.

Tran is a two-time World Series of Poker bracelet winner, a World Championship of Online Poker (WCOOP) Main Event champion, has made eight World Poker Tour (WPT) final tables, winner of a WPT title, won at the World Poker Challenge and is the WPT Player of the Year of their fifth season. Tran was the chip leader coming into the final table of the 2013 WSOP Main Event November Nine. He ended up finishing in 5th place for $2,106,893 for the biggest cash of his career.

Early life 

Tran was born in Vietnam, and is the youngest of eight children of Vietnamese parents.  When he was two years old, his family moved to the United States, where he later received a degree in Business Management Information Systems from California State University at Sacramento.

Tran built his bankroll playing the $9/$18 game at Capitol Casino in Sacramento, California. Tran has since noted that it had become too much of an action game to eke out a positive gain.

Poker career 

Tran has finished in the money at numerous poker tournaments, finishing 5th at the 2004 World Poker Finals and on the television bubble of the 2004 L.A. Poker Classic and 2005 Borgata Poker Open. He also finished 5th in the 2006 L.A. Poker Classic. All of these events were televised on the World Poker Tour (WPT).

Tran has made 3 final tables in the World Series of Poker (WSOP) and cashed in the $10,000 no limit hold'em main event in both 2004 and 2005, finishing 117th both years. Tran also finished 2nd in a World Series of Poker circuit event, winning $251,920.

On October 2, 2006, Tran won the main event at PokerStars' WCOOP, winning $670,000.

On March 2, 2007, Tran finished 2nd in the 2007 L.A. Poker Classic, winning $1,177,010. On March 28 he won his first WPT title, the World Poker Challenge, earning $683,473. He was also the World Poker Tour's Player of the Year.

Notable victories include:
 2003 Heavenly Hold'em, $300 limit hold'em: $74,150
 2005 Rio Las Vegas Poker Festival, $1,500 no limit hold'em: $97,470
 2006 WCOOP Main event, $2,500 no limit hold'em: $670,000

On June 30, 2008 Tran won his first bracelet at the 2008 World Series of Poker in Event 49, $1,500 No Limit event besting a field of 2718.  Tran took home $631,170 in winnings. In all, Tran cashed in 7 events at the 2008 WSOP, good for $896,392 in total winnings and a 6th-place finish in the 2008 WSOP Player of the Year.

In November 2008, Tran won The PartyPoker.com Premier League III by beating Tony G in heads-up play. Tran took home $300,000 for winning first place at the final table.

In June 2009, during the 40th Annual World Series of Poker, Tran won his second bracelet for winning the $2,500 Pot-limit Omaha event.

As of 2010, his total live tournament winnings amount to $7,996,635. His 28 cashes as the WSOP account for $1,694,280 of those winnings.

He has made the November 9 final table of the 2013 WSOP main event, where he started as chip leader but finished in 5th place.

Tran used all his poker knowledge and experience to overcome a short stack and with the major support of his friends and family, he won the latest WPT event held at the Thunder Valley Casino Resort on Mar 15–19, 2014.

As a result of his second WPT title, he became only the 20th player in history to win multiple WPT events. Overall, he cashed in almost $11 million while playing live tournament, according to Hendon Mob Database.

Awards
ALL IN Magazine 2007 Poker Player of the Year

World Series of Poker Bracelets

References

External links
 World Poker Tour profile

World Series of Poker bracelet winners
1977 births
American poker players
Living people
World Poker Tour winners
Vietnamese poker players
American people of Vietnamese descent